Eygelshoven Markt is a railway station located in Eygelshoven, Netherlands.

History

The station was opened in 1909 as Eygelshoven until its closure in 1952 and subsequent demolition. The station was rebuilt and opened on 9 December 2007 as Eygelshoven Markt. The station is located on the Sittard–Herzogenrath railway between Heerlen and Herzogenrath. The station was served by Euregiobahn until 15 December 2015 and until 9 December 2018 by DB Regio.

Eygelshoven Markt is located in the north of Eygelshoven, while  proper is located southwest of the town.

Train services
The following train services by Arriva Nederland call at this station:
 Aachen–Maastricht

External links
NS website 
Dutch public transport travel planner 

Railway stations in Kerkrade
Railway stations opened in 1909
Railway stations opened in 2007